Douglas Weir is a dam on the Vaal River, near Douglas, Northern Cape, South Africa. It was established in 1896 and raised in 1977.

See also
List of reservoirs and dams in South Africa
List of rivers of South Africa

References 
 List of South African Dams from the Department of Water Affairs and Forestry (South Africa)

Dams in South Africa
Dams completed in 1977